Cotoru River may refer to:

Cotoru, a tributary of the Jaleș in Gorj County, Romania
Cotoru, a tributary of the Măcriș in Gorj County, Romania

See also 
 Cotorca (disambiguation)
 Cotoroaia (disambiguation)